The Autogyro Cavalon is a German autogyro, designed and produced by AutoGyro GmbH of Hildesheim. It was introduced at the 2011 Aero show in Friedrichshafen. The aircraft is supplied as a complete ready-to-fly-aircraft.

Design and development
The Cavalon is a two-seats-in-side-by-side configuration development of the tandem-seating AutoGyro Calidus. It features a single main rotor, an enclosed cockpit with a complete aerodynamic cockpit fairing, tricycle landing gear with wheel pants and a four-cylinder, air and liquid-cooled, four-stroke, dual-ignition  Rotax 912 engine or turbocharged  Rotax 914 or  Rotax 915iS engine in pusher configuration.

The aircraft fuselage is made from composites and is a faired teardrop shape to ensure smooth airflow over the variable pitch pusher propeller. The design incorporates vibration dampers that greatly reduce the level of main rotor vibration transmitted to the cockpit.

The design was developed into the AutoGyro eCavalon electric aircraft in 2013.

Operational history
By October 2019, 50 examples had been registered in the United States with the Federal Aviation Administration, all of them in the Experimental - Amateur-built category.

Specifications (Cavalon)

References

External links

2010s German sport aircraft
Single-engined pusher autogyros
AutoGyro GmbH aircraft